Tron Church may refer to:
 Tron Kirk, a former Church of Scotland church in Edinburgh, Scotland
 St George's Tron Church, a Church of Scotland church in Glasgow, Scotland
 Tron Theatre, whose building was the home of a 17th-century Tron Church in Glasgow, Scotland
 The Tron Church at Kelvingrove, an evangelical Presbyterian church in Glasgow, Scotland